Mahbub ul Alam Chowdhury (7 November 1927 – 23 December 2007) was a Bangladeshi poet and language movement activist. His poem Kandte Ashini, Fanshir Dabi Niye Eshecchi (Have Come Not to Weep, but to Rally for Their Hanging) (1952) is the first among poems written on the background of the Bengali language movement.

Early life
Choudhury was born to Ahmadur Rahman Chowdhury and Rowshan Ara Begum. Choudhury was the nephew of L.A Chowdhury, a renowned social worker, politician, a close associate of Sher-e-Bangla AK Fazlul Huq, general secretary of the then Jukta Front in 1954 and president of Krishak Sramik Party, Chittagong. He passed the entrance examination with distinction from Gohira High School in 1947. While studying intermediate (IA) in Chittagong College he left Chittagong. He got involved in politics very early in his life. In 1942 he joined Quit India movement against British regime. In 1945 participated in the Bengal Provincial Students Summit where he came upon with the famous Bengali literature writers of that time. He went across the rural areas during the political turmoil in 1946. He also became the Secretary of the first ever Nazrul anniversary in Chittagong. After the formation of Pakistan in 1947, Choudhury formed a monthly magazine Shimanto.

Involvement in language movement
Choudhury was involved in the language movement from 1948 to 1956. In 1952 he was in the Chittagong State Language Action Committee. On February 21, after knowing the police incident at Dhaka University, he immediately wrote the poem Kadte Ashini which is the first influenced poem of the movement.

References

Bangladeshi male poets
1920s births
2007 deaths
Bengali language movement activists
Recipients of the Ekushey Padak
20th-century Bangladeshi poets
20th-century male writers